Amy Steel (born 7 April 1989 in East Melbourne, Victoria) is an Australian netball player currently playing for the Adelaide Thunderbirds in the ANZ Championship. She has also previously played for the Melbourne Kestrels and the Queensland Firebirds. Steel debuted with the Melbourne Vixens in Round 9 of the 2009 ANZ Championship season as a replacement for injured goal keeper Bianca Chatfield. Steel was also selected in the Australian U21 squad for the 2009 World Youth Netball Championships in the Cook Islands. She also competed in the 2010 and 2011 World Netball Series tournaments, both held at the Echo Arena in Liverpool, UK.

References

External links
 2011 ANZ Championship Profile: Amy Steel

1989 births
Living people
Australian Institute of Sport netball players
Melbourne Kestrels players
Melbourne Vixens players
Queensland Firebirds players
Adelaide Thunderbirds players
ANZ Championship players
Netball players from Melbourne
Australia international netball players
Australian netball players
Australian Netball League players
Australia international Fast5 players
South Australian Sports Institute netball players
People from East Melbourne
Sportswomen from Victoria (Australia)